(), also called known as  and , is the historical Chinese attire worn by the empresses of the Song dynasty and by the empresses and crown princesses (wife of crown prince) in the Ming Dynasty. It is a formal wear meant only for ceremonial purposes.

Terminology and forms 
The  has been worn by empresses and other royal noblewomen (differs according to different dynasties) since the Zhou dynasty.

Cultural significance and symbolism 

The  follows the traditional Confucian standard system for dressing, which is embodied in its form through the  system.

Pheasant pattern 

The -bird pattern is symbolism for "brilliance"; and the bird itself is a type of divine birds of five colours which represents the Empress' virtue. These five colours (i.e. blue, red, black, yellow, white) also correspond to the five elements; and thus, the usage of -bird pattern aligns with the traditional colour concept in Confucianism.

Small circular flowers 

They are placed between each pair of -bird pattern on the robe. The little flowers looks like a small wheel-shaped flower.

system 
The  was the most appropriate ceremonial clothing style of clothing for the Empress due to its symbolic meaning: it represented the harmony between Heaven, earth, and space. The  consists of an upper garment and a lower garment which represents the concept of Heaven and Earth; the upper garment is made of 4 panels of fabric representing the four seasons, and the lower garment is made of 12 panels of fabric which represents the time of the year. The wide cuff sleeves are round-shaped to symbolize the sky and the Confucian's scholars' deep knowledge and integration while the right-angled collar is square shaped to represents the earth warning Confucians that they should have integrity and kindness; together, the sleeves and the right-angled collar represents space as the circle and the square of the world.

History

Zhou dynasty 
The huiyi is an ancient system which was first recorded in the Zhou dynasty (c.  1046 BC – 256 BC). It was first recorded and codified in the Rites of Zhou. Huiyi was the highest of the empresses' six occasional clothing. The huiyi in Zhou dynasty was worn by the Empress as ceremonial clothing to pay respect during the ancestral shrine sacrifice which was the most important sacrificial event in which they could participate in. Following the Zhou dynasty, the subsequent dynasties perceived the huiyi as the highest form of ceremonial clothing. According to the Zhou dynasty rites, there were two types of black and blue clothing; however, there is currently no proof that the huiyi in the Zhou dynasty was black in colour.

Sui and Tang dynasty 
The huiyi in Sui and Tang dynasties was also blue in colour.

Song dynasty 
In the Song dynasty, the huiyi was the highest form of ceremonial clothing worn by the Empress; it was worn on important ceremonial occasions such as wedding, coronations, when holding court, and during ancestral shrine sacrifices. The Huiyi was made out of dark blue zhicheng (a kind of woven fabric). When empress wears the huiyi, she also needs to wear a phoenix crown, a blue inner garment and a dark blue bixi, with blue socks and shoes, along with a pair of jade pendants and other jade ornaments.

The early Song dynasty sanlitu shows illustration of the huiyi as being a form of shenyi, being deep blue and is decorated with di bird patterns.

In the Records of Chariots and Horses and Clothes written in the Yuan dynasty, the Song dynasty huiyi is described as being dark blue in colour and there are 12 lines of di birds which stand together in pair. There is a bixi (a knee covering) which hangs in the central region of the front skirt; the colour of bixi has the same colour as the bottom of the lower skirt. Di bird patterns can decorate the black, red collar edge in 3 lines. There is also a belt which is divided into a large belt made of silk (which is dark blue in with red lining with the upper surface part made of red brocade while the lower part made of green brocade) and narrow leather belt (which is cyan in colour decorated with white jade in pairs) is on top of the large silk belt. The socks are dark blue in colour; the shoes are also dark blue but decorated with gold ornaments.

The literature which describes the Song dynasty huiyi however does not always provide details (e.g. variations) which can be found in the Song dynasty court painting and some discrepancies can be found between the text and the paintings. From the several court portrait paintings of the Song dynasty, it is found that the huiyi was cross-collar closing to the right, with large and wide sleeves, and with cloud and dragons patterns ornamenting the collar, sleeves and placket, with a belt worn around the waist; and while all the huiyi were depicted as being deep blue in colour, they differed in shades of dark blue showing variation. Instead of being in three lines as described in the Yuan dynasty's records, in the Song paintings, the di bird pattern which decorates the belts is denser.

Ming dynasty 

The Huiyi was also the ceremonial dress of the empress in the Ming dynasty. In the Ming dynasty, the huiyi was composed of the phoenix crown, the xiapei, an overdress and long-sleeved blouse. In the Ming dynasty, there are however different kinds of phoenix crowns depending on the ranks of its wearer: the one for the empresses is decorated with 9 dragons and 4 phoenixes, and the ones for the imperial concubines had 9 multicoloured pheasants and 4 phoenixes, and the other for the titled women was called a coloured coronet, which was not decorated with dragons or phoenixes but with pearls, feathers of wild fowls and flower hairpins. The quedi is dyed in red instead of blue.

Qing dynasty

Modern Restoration

Influences and derivatives

Japan 
In Japan, the features of the Tang dynasty-style  was found as a textile within the formal attire of the Heian Japanese empresses.

Korea 
Korean queens started to wear the jeokui in 1370 AD under the final years of Gongmin of Goryeo, when Goryeo adopted the official ceremonial attire of the Ming dynasty. In the Joseon dynasty, the official dress worn by queens was wearing the jeokui which was adopted from the Ming dynasty's diyi. The jeokui was a ceremonial robe which was worn by the Joseon queens on the most formal occasions. It was worn together with jeokgwan in the late Goryeo and early Joseon, hapi, pyeseul. According to the Annals of Joseon, from 1403 to the first half of the 17th century the Ming Dynasty sent a letter, which confers the queen with a title along with the following items: jeokgwan, a vest called baeja, and a hapi. However, the jeokui sent by the Ming dynasty did not correspond to those worn by the Ming empresses as Joseon was considered to be ranked two ranks lower than Ming. Instead the jeokui which was bestowed corresponded to the Ming women's whose husband held the highest government official posts. The jeokdui worn by the queen and crown princess was originally made of red silk; it then became blue in 1897 when the Joseon king and queen were elevated to the status of emperor and empress.

The daesam is believed to be similar in form to the Ming dynasty's daxiushan, which was worn by the titled court women of the first rank. The daesam was another garment which was bestowed by the Ming dynasty from the reign of King Munjong of early Joseon to the 36th year of King Seonjo's reign in 1603; it continued to be worn even after the fall of the Ming dynasty. 

Following the fall of the Ming dynasty, Joseon established their own jeogui system. In the late Joseon, the daesam was modified to feature pheasant heads and a rank badge. In the Korea Empire, the blue jeokui was established for the Korea Empress. An example of the jeokui worn by the Korean empresses in Joseon can be seen in the Cultural Heritage Administration website. The xiaolunhua (小輪花) motif are known as ihwa motif in Korea. The Korean ihwa motif were likely designed in 1750 when Joseon established their own jeokui system, and may have used The Collected Statutes of the Ming Dynasty (大明會典) as reference. By the Korea Empire, the ihwa motif was revised and became one of the primary emblem of the Korean empire.

The jeokgwan was the Chinese crown decorated with pheasant motifs; it was worn by the queens and princesses of the Ming dynasty. The jeokgwan originated from the bonggwan which was worn from by the Chinese empresses. The jeokgwan was bestowed to Princess Noguk in late Goryeo by Empress Ma of Ming; it continued to bestowed in Joseon until the early 17th century. It stopped being bestowed after the fall of the Ming dynasty. In the late Joseon, the jeokgwan was changed into a big wig, called daesu which consisted with a gache and binyeo, following extensive reforms. The daesu was then worn until the end of Joseon.

2 variations of the diyi had been developed in Korea during the Joseon Dynasty, and later in the Korean Empire. The developments were as follows:
 During the Joseon Dynasty, the diyi was known as "Chijeok-ui" or jeokui, and is characterized as a predominant red outfit with a similarity to the wonsam.
 During the Korean Empire, the chijeok-ui was later changed into the (original) blue with red trim similar to its Chinese model.

Diyi were worn by:
 Princesses Consort on their marriage to the Crown Prince and on major ceremonies.
 Queens Consort on their coronation ceremony and on major ceremonies.
 The King's subsequent Queens Consort on their marriage to the King.
It was also worn by the queens and princesses when they visited the Royal Ancestors Shrine and when they were receiving morning visits from their retainers.

Vietnam 
According to the book, Weaving a realm published by the Vietnam Center, the diyi (翟衣) was known as Huy Địch (褘翟) in Vietnam and was recorded in the "Random Record of Great Changes". According to the Vietnam Center, the diyi might have historically been worn by the Vietnamese empress in Vietnam due to the existence of this sole record so far:“…Follow Eastern Zhōu’s rites to honor the new Consort Dowager’s coronation, in order to display the utmost appreciation of her services and to perfect the great ceremony. As for Địch Y dress, the shining glories stay in the fine-grained texture, and this shall be continuously succeeded. The imperial cemetery and bureaucracy, could glow even in the most remote and darkest of places!"

See also
 Hanfu
 List of Hanfu
Shenyi
Chinese auspicious ornaments in textile and clothing

Notes and references 

Chinese traditional clothing